Constantine Edmund Walter Phipps, 5th Marquess of Normanby (born 24 February 1954), is a British peer, novelist, poet, and entrepreneur.

Early life
Lord Normanby is the son of the Oswald Phipps, 4th Marquess of Normanby and The Honourable Grania Guinness, daughter of the 1st Baron Moyne.

He was educated at Eton College, Worcester College, Oxford and City University of London.

Publications
He is the author of three novels under the name Constantine Phipps: Careful with the Sharks (1985), Among the Thin Ghosts (1989), and What You Want (2014).

Business interests
He is the owner of the Mulgrave Estate and Mulgrave Castle, near Whitby, in North Yorkshire.  He is the founder of Mulgrave Properties LLP, a residential developer in Yorkshire.  His indirect wealth includes a sizeable interest in property in West Vancouver, Canada, via British Pacific Properties Ltd of which he is a director.  In 1998 he sold the  Warter Priory estate, near Pocklington, East Riding of Yorkshire, to businessman Malcolm Healey.

Philanthropy
Lord Normanby is chairman of the Normanby Charitable Trust which has a North Yorkshire focus.  The trust has also supported Trinity College, Dublin, and Oxford University.

Personal life
With Sophie McCormick he has a daughter, the actress Pandora McCormick (b. 12 December 1984).

In 1990, he married the journalist and author Nicola Shulman (daughter of theatre critic Milton Shulman and sister of British Vogue editor Alexandra Shulman) and had three children:
Lady Sibylla Victoria Evelyn Phipps (b. 6 August 1991)
John Samuel Constantine 'Phippsy' Phipps, Earl of Mulgrave (b. 26 November 1994)
Lord Thomas Henry Winston Phipps (b. 3 June 1997)

He succeeded his father in the Marquessate in 1994 and entered the House of Lords as a crossbencher. He lost his seat under the House of Lords Act 1999.

Lord Normanby lives in London and at Mulgrave Castle.

References

External links

British Pacific Properties
http://www.thepeerage.com/p1193.htm#i11926

1954 births
Living people
Constantine Phipps, 5th Marquess of Normanby
Constantine
Alumni of Worcester College, Oxford
5

Normanby